Muzhi is a rural locality (a selo) and the administrative center of Shuryshkarsky District of Yamalo-Nenets Autonomous Okrug, Russia, located on the bank of the Ob River. Population:

References

Rural localities in Yamalo-Nenets Autonomous Okrug
Road-inaccessible communities of Russia